Adgur Rafet-ipa Kharaziya, is the current Mayor of Sukhumi and a former Minister of Agriculture and Vice Speaker of the People's Assembly of Abkhazia.

Acting Mayor of Sukhumi (first time)
Adgur Kharaziya was head of the Gulripshi District assembly before he was appointed acting mayor of Sukhumi by president Vladislav Ardzinba on 5 November 2004, in the heated aftermath of the 2004 presidential election, succeeding Leonid Lolua. During his first speech he called upon the two leading candidates, Sergei Bagapsh and Raul Khadjimba, to both withdraw.

On February 16 of 2005, newly elected President Bagapsh replaced Kharaziya with Astamur Adleiba as mayor of Sukhumi.

Member of the People's Assembly of Abkhazia
In the 2007 parliamentary elections Adgur Kharaziya successfully stood as candidate in the Dranda precinct No. 24, winning a majority in the first round. He formed part of the opposition. During the assembly's first meeting after the election Kharaziya was nominated for the position of speaker by fellow MP Rita Lolua but lost to Nugzar Ashuba.
On the 27th of July 2007, Kharaziya took part in a round table on free speech organised by journalists that called upon the government to end what it called the pursuit of independent and opposition media.

Mayor of Sukhumi (second time)
Following the May 2014 Revolution and the election of Raul Khajimba, Kharaziya was again appointed as Acting Mayor of Sukhumi on 22 October 2014. On 4 April 2015, he won the by-election to the City Council in constituency no. 3 unopposed, and was confirmed as mayor on 4 May.

References

Living people
5th convocation of the People's Assembly of Abkhazia
Mayors of Sukhumi
4th convocation of the People's Assembly of Abkhazia
Ministers for Agriculture of Abkhazia
Heads of Gulripshi District
Members of the Sukhumi City Council
Year of birth missing (living people)